Chaptalia texana, common name silverpuff , is a North American species of plants in the family Asteraceae.  It is native to Mexico, Texas, and New Mexico.

Chaptalia texana is a perennial plant growing from a large root. Leaves are in a basal rosette close to the ground, with dense woolly hairs on the underside but not on top. There is generally only one flower head, held on an unbranched stalk; head is nodding (hanging) at fruiting time but not at flowering time. Flowers are cream-colored, turning reddish as they get old.

References

External links
photo of herbarium specimen collected in Nuevo León
Lady Bird Johnson Wildflower Center, University of Texas
Excerpts from Jim Conrad's Naturalist Newsletter

Mutisieae
Flora of Mexico
Flora of the Southwestern United States
Plants described in 1906